T.O Entertainment adapted Shinkyoku Sōkai Polyphonica into a twelve episode anime series directed by Junichi Watanabe and Masami Shimoda and written by Ichiro Sakaki. On February 6, 2007, one month after the first manga adaptation was announced, the anime adaptation was announced. Broadcast on TBS, the series premiered on April 3, 2007 and aired weekly until its conclusion on June 19, 2007. The music was composed by Hikaru Nanase. Two pieces of theme music were used for the first. "Apocrypha" is performed by Eufonius as the opening theme.  is performed by Kukui as the ending theme.

Diomedea adapted the series into another season entitled Shinkyoku Sōkai Polyphonica Crimson S, directed by Toshimasa Suzuki and written by Ken'ichi Kanemaki, that is not a continuation of the first season but a prequel to it and will tie into Ichiro Sakaki and Noboru Kannatsuki's light novel adaptation of the same name. The official website was launched on November 11, 2008 and began streaming a promotional video on March 23, 2009 featuring the anime's opening theme but contained no actual anime footage. The series premiered on TVK and TV Saitama on March 4, 2009 and is currently broadcasting weekly. The series was also broadcast on AT-X, Gifu Broadcasting, MBS, and Mie TV. The music is directed by Jin Aketagawa and composed by Magic Capsule. Two pieces of theme music were used for the second season. "Phosphorous" is performed by eufonius as the opening theme.  is performed by Haruka Tomatsu as ending theme.

Shinkyoku Sōkai Polyphonica

Shinkyoku Sōkai Polyphonica Crimson S 
This series involves characters in the Crimson series but covers events when Phoron, Eufinley and Rembart are still students at Torvas Academy.  The opening theme song for Crimson S is the same as in the first series.

References

External links
 Anime Network - Watch - Polyphonica
 Anime Network - Watch - Polyphonica Crimson S
 
 

Shinkyoku Sokai Polyphonica